Zul Sutan (27 February 1957 – 5 December 2018) was a Singaporean singer and guitarist. A local music icon, Zul as frontman of rock band Tania became a household name in Singapore's music scene in a career spanning more than 40 years. He died of health complications at National University Hospital on 5 December 2018, aged 61.

References

External links
 

1957 births
2018 deaths
20th-century Singaporean male singers